Tabriz Stock Exchange (TSE) is the second regional stock exchange forum in Iran which first opened in October 2003 in Tabriz city in East Azerbaijan. Tabriz is one of the most important metropolises in Iran and also is the hub of commerce and industry and agriculture. 
Tabriz stock exchange operates under the Tehran Stock Exchange's supervision and all registered companies in Tehran Stock Exchange are dual listed in Tabriz Stock Exchange.

History 
Tabriz stock exchange is the second stock exchange forum in Iran. It opened its doors in 2003 and at was first managed by Belal Kheyravar. Tabriz Stock Exchange started its operations with 13 stock brokerages. As of 2014, TSE has 43 brokerages and Mohammad Amin Abedini is its CEO.

Tabriz stock exchange performance 
Tabriz Stock Exchange acts under the direct supervision of Tehran Stock Exchange and all of listed companies in Tehran Stock Exchange are dual listed in Tabriz Stock Exchange. 

TSE offers securities such as common stock, preference shares, bonds, sukuk, common units of investment funds, securities housing facilities, and derivatives.

Tabriz Stock Exchange's trading system is the same as the Tehran Stock Exchange. At first it was the AS/400 trading system, then PAM trading system, and as of 2015, the EBS trading system.

See also
Tehran Stock Exchange
Banking in Iran
Economy of Iran

References 

Stock exchanges in Iran
Tabriz
2003 establishments in Iran